Alien Mysteries is a Canadian UFO documentary series featuring eyewitness testimony that is produced by Exploration Production Inc. for Discovery Channel (Canada). Alien Mysteries showcases the real-life stories of ordinary people who claim to have fallen victim to alien abduction or attack. Alien Mysteries debuted on Discovery Canada on 3 March 2013.

United States pickup 
In March 2013, Destination America, which is Discovery Channel Canada's sister network in the United States, purchased the distribution rights. Alien Mysteries made its debut in the United States in April 2013.

Episodes 
Alien Mysteries has six episodes:

References

External links 
Alien Mysteries on the Discovery website
Alien Mysteries on the Exploration website

2013 Canadian television series debuts
Discovery Channel (Canada) original programming
Destination America original programming
2010s Canadian documentary television series